Rudi Isaacs (born 31 January 1986 in Cape Town) is a South African association football defender and midfielder who was capped for South Africa.

References 

1986 births
Living people
Cape Coloureds
Sportspeople from Cape Town
South African soccer players
Moroka Swallows F.C. players
SuperSport United F.C. players
Highlands Park F.C. players
Association football defenders
South Africa international soccer players
Association football midfielders
Hellenic F.C. players
University of Pretoria F.C. players
Vasco da Gama (South Africa) players